Brother Jack McDuff Live! is a live album of jazz music by organist Jack McDuff recorded in New Jersey in 1963 and released on the Prestige label.

Reception

In his review for AllMusic, Scott Mason states,"Brother Jack McDuff Live! is an outstanding album, one of the purest examples ever of quite possibly the finest Hammond B3 organ player in the world".

Track listing 
All compositions by Jack McDuff except as indicated
 "Rock Candy" - 6:40  
 "It Ain't Necessarily So" (George Gershwin, Ira Gershwin) - 6:37  
 "Sanctified Samba" - 4:50  
 "Whistle While You Work" (Frank Churchill, Larry Morey) - 5:11  
 "A Real Goodun'" - 7:42  
 "Undecided" (Sydney Robin, Charlie Shavers) - 8:16

Personnel 
Jack McDuff - organ
Red Holloway - tenor saxophone
George Benson - guitar
Joe Dukes - drums

References 

Jack McDuff live albums
1963 live albums
Prestige Records live albums